The office of the Mayor of Nantes is a directly elected position. Since 1947 there have been five mayors; the term of office is for a period of six years. The current mayor is Johanna Rolland (PS).

See also
 Timeline of Nantes

References 
List of mayors of major French cities

 
Nantes